The Yuval Ron Ensemble is a musical group that focuses on traditional sacred Middle Eastern repertoire.  The group’s stated mission is to “alleviate national, racial, religious and cultural divides by uniting the music and dance of the people of the Middle East into a unique mystical, spiritual and inspiring musical celebration.”

History and Personnel
The group was founded in 1999 by composer, producer, and oud player Yuval Ron.  The ensemble includes musicians of all three major Abrahamic faiths: Jewish, Muslim, and Christian.  The group’s members are: Najwa Gibran (vocals), Maya Haddi (vocals), Sukhawat Ali Khan (Qawwali vocals and harmonium), Norik Manoukian (duduk and woodwinds),  Virginie Alumyan (kanoun), Jamie Papish (percussion), and David Martinelli (percussion).  Ensemble performances often include a visual component as well, with sufi whirling dervish Aziz or devotional dancer Maya Gabay.

Major Performances
The Yuval Ron Ensemble is based in Los Angeles, CA, and has performed nationally as well as internationally.  Some notable performances include: the International Sacred Music Festival of Fez (Morocco), International Oud Festival and "peace tour" (The Settler-Colonial State of Israel), World Festival of Sacred Music (Los Angeles), headlining the Dalai Lama’s “Seeds of Compassion” benefit concert (Seattle), the International Peace Festival (South Korea), as well as concerts in Mexico, Spain, Turkey, and Poland.

Awards
The group has received grants from the National Endowment for the Arts, was honored with the Los Angeles Treasures Award and the Lincoln/Standing Bear Gold Medal from the City of Lincoln, NE in appreciation of its efforts for peace and justice worldwide.

Discography
 Seeker of Truth
 Tree of Life 
 Under the Olive Tree

External links

American world music groups